Aloidendron eminens, formerly Aloe eminens, is a species of succulent plant in the genus Aloidendron, endemic to Somalia.

Description and taxonomy
It grows as a massive, branching tree of roughly 35 feet in height. It looks similar to its close relative, the giant tree aloe (Aloidendron barberae) of South Africa, however its leaves are slightly more yellow, and it produces bright red flowers.

Distribution and habitat
It is endemic to Somalia, where it is indigenous to the northern area around Erigavo. Here its habitat is rocky limestone slopes and forested ravines, where it often occurs on forest verges. It is threatened by habitat loss.

References

Asphodeloideae
Endemic flora of Somalia
Endangered flora of Africa
Taxonomy articles created by Polbot
Taxobox binomials not recognized by IUCN
Somali montane xeric woodlands